Kimio (written: 公雄, 公郎, 公生, 規三生, 喜民夫, 喜美雄 or きみお in hiragana) is a masculine Japanese given name. Notable people with the name include:

, Japanese musician
, Japanese ice hockey player
, Japanese volleyball player
, Japanese animator
, Japanese high jumper
, Japanese Go player
, Japanese manga artist

Japanese masculine given names